is the debut studio album by Japanese band Garnet Crow. It was released on January 31, 2001 under Giza Studio.

Background
The album consist of six previously released singles.

Two out of thirteen tracks, Kimi no Uchi ni Tsuku made Zutto Hashitte Yuku and Futari no Rocket were previously released in their indies album First Kaleidscope: Kimi no Uchi ni Tsuku made Zutto Hashitte Yuku with the small instrumental and arrangement change.

Rhythm was supposed to release as fourth single, however due to unknown reason the release was canceled and was replaced with the release of single Sen Ijō no Kotoba wo Narabete mo.

Natsu no Maboroshi received album mix under title secret arrange.

A leading album track Mizu no Nai Hareta Umi e was released in Giza Studio's compilation album Giza Studio Masterpiece Blend 2001.

This album was released on the same day as Nana Azuki's first poetry book 80,0.

Commercial performance 
"First Soundscope: Mizu no Nai Hareta Umi e" made its chart debut on the official Oricon Albums Chart at #6 rank for first week with 51,830 sold copies. It charted for 5 weeks and totally sold 87,150 copies.

Track listing 
All tracks are composed by Yuri Nakamura, written by Nana Azuki, arranged by Hirohito Furui (expect #1 and #2, by Miguel Sá Pessoa).

Personnel
Credits adapted from the CD booklet of First Soundscope: Mizu no Nai Hareta Umi he.

Yuri Nakamura - vocals, composing
Nana Azuki - songwriting, keyboard
Hirohito Furui - arranging, keyboard
Hitoshi Okamoto - acoustic guitar, bass
Miguel Sá Pessoa - keyboards, recording, mixing
Michael Africk - backing vocals
Aaron Hsu-Flanders - acoustic guitar
John Clark - electric guitar
Ryu Yokoji - saxophone
Yoshinobu Ohga (nothin' but love) - acoustic guitar, electric guitar
Hiroshi Tokunaga - bass
Toshikazu Kamei - drums
Akio Nakajima - recording, mixing
Takayuki Ichikawa - recording, mixing
Katsuyuki Yoshimatsu - assistant engineer
Masahiro Shimada - mastering
Gan Kojima – art direction
Kanonji - producing

Usage in media 
Mysterious Eyes - opening theme for Anime television series Detective Conan
Futari no Rocket - campaign theme song for MFTV
Sen Ijō no Kotoba wo Narabete mo - commercial song for Dome
Natsu no Maboroshi - ending theme for Anime television series Detective Conan
flying - opening theme for PlayStation game Tales of Eternia

References 

2001 albums
Being Inc. albums
Giza Studio albums
Japanese-language albums
Garnet Crow albums
Albums produced by Daiko Nagato